One Degree Initiative Foundation (sometimes refer as 1° Initiative) is nonprofit youth organisation based in Bangladesh with chapters in Canada, USA and Nepal. The basic function of the foundation is provide mentorship, between 6 and 18 months, to young people aged 15–25 years to engage them in active citizenship and social entrepreneurship.

History
One Degree Initiative Foundation was founded in 2006 by a group of high school students.

Awards 
 Zonta International Award for Young Women in Public Affairs (YWPA) in 2009 and 2010
 Best Partner Voluntary Organisation at Youth of the Nation Awards by JAAGO Foundation in 2009
 Represented at the Asian Youth Conference on Biodiversity in Japan in 2009
 Represented at the World Leadership Conference in Singapore in 2009
 Awarded Certificate of Appreciation by US Under Secretary for Political Affairs, Wendy R. Sherman for its efforts during the Savar tragedy and work towards rehabilitating its victims in 2013
 Represented at the Asia 21 Young Leaders in 2013
 Represented at the UNAoC-EF Summer School in USA in 2014

References

Youth organisations based in Bangladesh
2006 establishments in Bangladesh
Organizations established in 2006